Gwangju No clan was one of the Korean clans. Their Bon-gwan was in Gwangju, Gyeonggi Province. According to the research in 2000, the number of Gwangju No clan was 15158. Lu’s surname was Chinese origin, and the surname came from the fact that Bo Qin was appointed as Lu and called himself as Lu.  founded Gija Joseon with Gija when  conquered Korea.

See also 
 Korean clan names of foreign origin

References

External links 
 

 
Korean clan names of Chinese origin